Peter Gilmore (born 18 May 1968) is an Australian chef. He is the current executive chef of the Quay restaurant, which has been included in The World's 50 Best Restaurants since 2009, and the Bennelong, at the Sydney Opera House.

Gilmore is also a recurring guest on Masterchef Australia, where his signature dessert the "Snow Egg" was touted as one of the toughest Masterchef challenges.

Career 
He was inspired to cook at a young age and started his apprenticeship at 16, then spent his twenties working in kitchens overseas and in country New South Wales, developing his own style. Critical recognition came in 2000 when Peter was the Head Chef at De Beers Restaurant at Whale Beach and Terry Durack, food reviewer for The Sydney Morning Herald, wrote "De Beers houses a young chef with a real talent for sending out beautifully structured food with innate simplicity".

Style 
Across both of his restaurants, Chef Gilmore describes his cuisine as food inspired by nature and as a passionate gardener himself, he was one of the first chefs in Australia to embrace heirloom varieties of vegetables, and continues to work in partnership with small and artisan producers who cultivate bespoke produce exclusively for both Quay and Bennelong. Chef Gilmore collaborates with a range of producers across New South Wales and also Australia, from the fishermen who hand dive and line catch the seafood he serves to the farmers who rear rare breed animals with superior flavour and texture for the table.

Awards 
Since taking the helm in the kitchen at Quay, the restaurant was listed for five years in the World’s 50 Best Restaurants and most recently in 2015 was placed at 58th in the World’s 100 Best Restaurants. Quay has been awarded Three Chefs Hats for 14 consecutive years and named Restaurant of the Year five times in The Sydney Morning Herald Good Food Guide. It has three stars and has been awarded Restaurant of the Year three times in the Australian Gourmet Traveller Restaurant Guide.

In November 2014, The Fink Group was awarded the coveted 10-year tender of the iconic Bennelong Restaurant at the Sydney Opera House. Under the helm of Gilmore, the new restaurant opened on 1 July 2015 with a tri-level layout and showcases the flavour, diversity and quality of Australian produce.

Personal life
Gilmore was born and bred in Sydney, During his teen years he attended Cumberland High School. He is married to Kath and they have two sons.

Publications
 Gilmore, Peter (2010) Quay: Food Inspired by Nature, 
 Gilmore, Peter (2014) Organum: Nature, Texture, Intensity, Purity
 The Peter Gilmore App (2014).

References

Living people
Australian food writers
Australian chefs
Australian television chefs
1968 births